The 1996 Indonesia Open was a men's tennis tournament played on outdoor hard courts at the Gelora Senayan Stadium in Jakarta in Indonesia and was part of the World Series of the 1996 ATP Tour. It was the fourth edition of the tournament since its reboot in 1993 and ran from 8 January through 14 January 1996. Fifth-seeded Sjeng Schalken won the singles title.

Finals

Singles

 Sjeng Schalken defeated  Younes El Aynaoui 6–3, 6–2
 It was Schalken's only singles title of the year and the 2nd of his career.

Doubles

 Rick Leach /  Scott Melville defeated  Kent Kinnear /  Dave Randall 6–1, 2–6, 6–1
 It was Leach's 1st title of the year and the 32nd of his career. It was Melville's 1st title of the year and the 8th of his career.

References

External links
 ITF tournament edition details

Indonesia Open
Jakarta Open
1996 in Indonesian tennis